Our Kind of Traitor, published in 2010, is a novel by the British author John le Carré, about a Russian money launderer seeking to defect after his close friend is killed by his new superiors.

Plot summary 
On a tennis holiday in Antigua, British university lecturer Peregrine "Perry" Makepiece and his lawyer girlfriend Gail Perkins meet mysterious Russian business oligarch Dmitri "Dima" Vladimirovich Krasnov and his family. Dima, who describes himself as "the world's number one money launderer," deliberately sought contact with Perry hoping that he is a British spy or knows one. This is because Dima wants Perry to pass on information about his criminal activities to British intelligence, in exchange for protection for himself and his family. Dima fears for his life because "The Prince", the new leader of his criminal brotherhood, had a good friend of Dima and his wife murdered. The Prince now wants Dima to come to Bern to sign over control of the money-laundering operations to him.

Back in the UK, Perry reaches out to a colleague with contacts in the British intelligence community and hands over Dima's notes. Since these implicate a high-ranking decision maker in the UK, British intelligence decides to put government fixer Hector Meredith in charge of a secret semi-official investigation. Hector recruits disgraced intelligence officer Luke Weaver to handle the investigation. Luke, eager to redeem himself, makes all the necessary arrangements. Dima insists that Perry and Gail be present during his first contact with British intelligence in Paris during the 2009 Roland Garros final, so the couple travel to Paris where they again meet with Dima and his family.

After Dima signs the papers handing over his assets to a representative of "The Prince", he meets with Luke and is extracted, along with his family, to a safe house in the Swiss Alps. They wait there until British intelligence insists that only Dima travel to the UK; his family will be allowed to join him later if his information proves correct. Dima reluctantly agrees and travels with Luke to catch the charter plane that is supposed to bring them to the UK, only to be killed as the plane explodes shortly after take-off.

Reception
The New York Times reviewer Michiko Kakutani described it as "part vintage John le Carré and part Alfred Hitchcock", calling it the author's most thrilling thriller in years. James Naughtie, writing for The Telegraph, praised le Carré's dialogue, saying his "greatest gift may be his ear, which allows him to pick up a tremor of fear in the softest voice or a false note in any exchange of words and play with them to his heart’s content. He can therefore create, in dialogue, a trembling soundscape that has a pitch-perfect quality." While praising the book, The Guardians Christopher Tayler wrote: "By this stage of his career, Le Carré seems more interested in the telling than the tale, and in the actors more than in their actions. But his deft setting up of colourful characters, and slightly less deft meshing of psychology and plot requirements, doesn't always make for narrative tension. The long, fussily narrated opening, in particular, takes nearly 100 pages to get the reader hooked."

In other media

Film 

British director Susanna White made a film adaptation in 2016, based on a screenplay by Hossein Amini. Starring Ewan McGregor, Naomie Harris, Stellan Skarsgård, Damian Lewis, and Alicia von Rittberg, the film was released in the United Kingdom on 13 May 2016.

References

External links
John le Carré on His New Novel, Our Kind of Traitor - video interview by Democracy Now!
Book review by The Independents literary editor, Boyd Tonkin
Book review by The Scotsmans literary editor, Ian Campbell

2010 British novels
British novels adapted into films
Novels by John le Carré
British thriller novels
Novels about the Russian Mafia